The Quintettsatz in D minor, Hess 40, is an incomplete composition for string quintet with two violas by Ludwig van Beethoven. Comprising a completed prelude and an incomplete fugue, it was composed in 1817 around the same time as the Fugue for String Quintet in D major, Op. 137.

Background 

From surviving manuscripts, it appears that Beethoven first started work on the quintet around 1815, with sketches of the fugue being found amongst sketches for the Ninth Symphony.  It is unclear at this time if Beethoven completed the work.

Structure 

The composition, which takes around three minutes to perform, is structured as a single movement marked Adagio - Allegro.

References
Note

Sources

External links 
 
 

 H040
1817 compositions
Compositions in D minor
Compositions by Ludwig van Beethoven published posthumously